Robert "Ginney" Robinson (birthdate unknown)  was an American baseball catcher and in the pre-Negro leagues.

Robinson was on teams lists in Chicago from 1902 to 1908. He then moved to Kansas City to play for the Kansas City Giants from 1909 to 1911.

He caught for Bill Holland, Will Horn, Walter Ball, Bill Gatewood, Harry Buckner, Bill Lindsay, and Hurley McNair.

References

External links
  and Seamheads

Algona Brownies players
Columbia Giants players
Leland Giants players
Year of birth missing
Year of death missing
Kansas City Giants players
Kansas City Royal Giants players